Signature is a music album by Irish musician Moya Brennan. This is her seventh solo album to be released. It was released on the 9 October 2006 in Ireland, the UK and the Netherlands. The worldwide release was scheduled for early 2007, but was temporarily delayed until 25 September 2007.

Release
Announcement from her official site:

Sunday, 16 July 2006

"In the last few days Moya has completed the recording and mixing of her new album entitled Signature.
Release is planned in Europe for late September but check back here for release dates in specific places.
We can now reveal the track listing for the album (and we anticipate that some of the titles will give rise to discussion!)"

Snip from her official website on 'Signature'

Signature looks back over a life less ordinary and portrays Moya's experiences through a collection of twelve superb tracks. Musically sharp and finely tuned, the album cleverly treads a fine line between the contemporary and the traditional while Moya emerges as a skilled songwriter with a global ear. In true Irish tradition, many of the songs have that bittersweet flavour - so this is no rose-tinted retrospective. Rather, Signature is a series of snapshots of Moya’s life – each chosen moment launches a lyrical reflection - which, when all woven together, produce a tapestry of contrasting colours and emotions.

Track listing
"Purple Haze"
"No One Talks"
"Merry-Go-Round"
"I Will Find You" – only on worldwide release
"Always"
"Tapestry"
"Black Night"
"Hear My Prayer"
"Never Stray Far Away"
"Many Faces"
"Hidden Stories"
"Gone Are the Days"
"Pill A Rún Ó"
"Merry-Go-Round" (Special Branch Mix) – only on special editions

Singles

Commercial singles
"No One Talks"
"Merry-Go-Round"

Promotional singles
"No One Talks"
"Merry-Go-Round"

Special Tour Edition

The Special Tour Edition is a re-release of the album Signature, including a new bonus CD with five live tracks. All tracks were recorded live in Castleblaney, County Monaghan, Ireland.

Track listing
"Purple Haze"
"No One Talks"
"Merry-Go-Round"
"Always"
"Tapestry"
"Black Night"
"Hear My Prayer"
"Never Stray Far Away"
"Many Faces"
"Hidden Stories"
"Gone Are the Days"
"Pill A Rún Ó"

 Bonus Tracks
"Pill A Rún Ó"
"Black Night"
"Many Faces"
"Tapestry"
"Gone Are the Days"

Release history

References

External links
 'Signature' E-Card
 Signature at Northern Skyline
 Signature Live at Northern Skyline

Moya Brennan albums
2006 albums
Universal Records albums